SEPTA's subway–surface trolley route 34, also called the Baltimore Avenue subway line, is a trolley line operated by the Southeastern Pennsylvania Transportation Authority (SEPTA) that connects the 13th Street station in downtown Philadelphia, Pennsylvania, to the Angora Loop station in the Angora neighborhood of West Philadelphia.

At , it is the shortest of SEPTA's five subway–surface trolley lines, which operate on street-level tracks in West Philadelphia and Delaware County, Pennsylvania, and in a shared subway with rapid transit trains in Center City.

Route description
Starting from its eastern end at the 13th Street station, Route 34 runs in a tunnel under Market Street. It stops at underground stations at 15th Street, 19th Street, 22nd Street, 30th Street, and 33rd Street. From 15th to 30th Streets, it runs on the outer tracks in the same tunnel as SEPTA's Market–Frankford Line.

Passengers may transfer free of charge to the Market–Frankford Line at 13th, 15th, and 30th Streets and to the Broad Street Line at 15th Street.  Connections to the SEPTA Regional Rail are also available.  Underground passageways connect the 13th and 15th Street Stations to Jefferson Station and Suburban Station.

Route 34 surfaces at the 40th Street Portal near 40th Street and Baltimore Avenue (US 13), then heads west on Baltimore until it ends at a loop at 61st Street.

History

The Delaware County and Philadelphia Electric Railway Company installed transit tracks for horsecars running along Baltimore Avenue as early as 1890, but it was the arrival of the electrified trolley two years later that allowed the extension of the line westward to the new community of Angora.

The line was routed into the subway–surface tunnel on December 15, 1906. The route was called the Angora Line until it was given the number 34 in 1911.

In April 2020, the line's operations were suspended due to the COVID-19 pandemic. Service resumed on May 17, 2020.

In 2021, SEPTA proposed rebranding their rail transit service as "SEPTA Metro", in order to make the system easier to navigate. Under this proposal, the subway–surface lines will be rebranded as the "T" lines with a green color and numeric suffixes for each service, and Route 34 would be renamed "T2 Baltimore Avenue." SEPTA described that "most comments were positive" in the public comment period for this rebranding project.

Stations and stops
All are in the City of Philadelphia.

References

External links

1974 Philadelphia Trolley Brochure, pages 12-13 and 14-15

34
Tram routes in Philadelphia